A list of films produced by the Marathi language film industry based in Maharashtra in the year 2012.

January – March

April – June

July – September

October – December

References

External links
 

Lists of 2012 films by country or language
2012
2012 in Indian cinema